Urmas Dresen (born in 1958) is an Estonian historian.

Since 1998 he is the head of Estonian Maritime Museum.

In 2013, he was awarded with Order of the White Star, IV class.

References

Living people
1958 births
20th-century Estonian historians
21st-century Estonian historians